Fibigia clypeata is an Asian species of flowering plant of the genus Fibigia in the family Brassicaceae. It is distributed throughout Greece, Iran, Jordan, Lebanon, Palestine, Syria and Turkey, where it flowers between February and April.

This plant is found in abundance and is native to the Shouf Biosphere Reserve in Lebanon. Its common Arabic name is بتلة كالمرساة. Its common English name is False-gypsophila ankyropetalum. Its common French name is Ankyropetale fausse- gypsophylle.

It is a drought-tolerant perennial suitable for xeriscaping.

Its current name is Fibigia clypeata subsp. eriocarpa (DC. ,Greuter, 2012). Its homotypic synonyms are Farsetia eriocarpa (DC., 1821) and Fibigia Eriocarpa (DC., Boiss., 1867).

References

Brassicaceae
Plants described in 1753
Taxa named by Carl Linnaeus